Ventsislav Zhelev (born 28 February 1980) is a Bulgarian footballer currently playing for Dobrudzha Dobrich as a midfielder.

References

1980 births
Living people
Bulgarian footballers
PFC Beroe Stara Zagora players
PFC Nesebar players
PFC Dobrudzha Dobrich players
First Professional Football League (Bulgaria) players

Association football midfielders
People from Dobrich